The Onoğurs or Oğurs (Ὀνόγουροι, Οὔρωγοι, Οὔγωροι; Onογurs, Ογurs; "ten tribes", "tribes"), were Turkic nomadic equestrians who flourished in the Pontic–Caspian steppe and the Volga region between 5th and 7th century, and spoke the Oghuric language.

Etymology
The name Onoğur is widely thought to derive from On-Oğur "ten Oğurs (tribes)". Modern scholars consider Turkic terms for tribe oğuz and oğur to be derived from Turkic *og/uq, meaning "kinship or being akin to". The terms initially were not the same, as oq/ogsiz meant "arrow", while oğul meant "offspring, child, son", oğuš/uğuš was "tribe, clan", and the verb oğša-/oqša meant "to be like, resemble". The Oghuric tribes are often connected with the Hungarians, whose exo-ethnonym is usually derived from On-Oğur (> (H)Ungari).

Language
The Onoghuric or Oghuric languages are a branch of the Turkic languages. Some scholars suggest Hunnic had strong ties with Oghuric languages and refer to this extended Oghuric grouping as Hunno-Bulgar languages.

History
The Onogurs were one of the first Oghuric Turkic tribes that entered the Ponto-Caspian steppes as the result of migrations set off in Inner Asia. The 10th century Movses Kaghankatvatsi recorded, considered late 4th century, certain Honagur, "a Hun from the Honk" who raided Persia, which were related to the Onoghurs, and located near Transcaucasia and the Sassanian Empire. Scholars also relate the Hyōn to this account. 

According to Priscus, in 463 the representatives of Ernak's Saraghurs (Oghur. sara, "White Oghurs"), Oghurs and Onoghurs came to the Emperor in Constantinople, and explained they had been driven out of their homeland by the Sabirs, who had been attacked by the Avars in Inner Asia. This tangle of events indicates that the Oghuric tribes are related to the Ting-ling and Tiele people. It is considered they belonged to the westernmost Tiele tribes, which also included the Uyghurs-Toquz Oghuz and the Oghuz Turks, and were initially located in Western Siberia and Kazakhstan. Leo I the Thracian granted Ernak the lands of the treacherous Karadach's Akatziroi roughly corresponding to 20th century Ukraine. Later kings of the Onogur Huns included Grod, Mugel and Sandilch, whose Utigurs were engaged in a civil war against the Kutrigurs of Khinialon. 

The origin of the Kutrigurs and Utigurs, who lived in the vicinity of the Onoghurs and Bulgars, and their mutual relationship, is considered obscure. Scholars are unsure how the union between Onoghurs and Bulgars formed, imagining it as a long process in which a number of different groups merged. During that time, the Bulgars may have represented a large confederation of which the Onoghurs formed one of the core tribes, together with the remnants of the Utigurs and Kutrigurs, among others.

Jordanes in Getica (551) mentioned that the Hunuguri (believed to be the Onoghurs) were notable for the marten skin trade. In the Middle Ages, marten skin was used as a substitute for minted money. This also indicates they lived near forests and were in contact with Finno-Ugrian peoples.

The Syriac translation of the Pseudo-Zacharias Rhetor's Ecclesiastical History (c. 555) in Western Eurasia records the Avnagur (Aunagur; considered Onoghurs), wngwr (Onoğur), wgr (Oghur).The author wrote following: "Avnagur (Aunagur) are people, who live in tents. Avgar, sabir, burgar, alan, kurtargar, avar, hasar, dirmar, sirurgur, bagrasir, kulas, abdel and hephtalit are thirteen peoples, who live in tents, earn their living on the meat of livestock and fish, of wild animals and by their weapons (plunder)". About the Bulgars and Alans, during the first half of 6th century, he added: "The land Bazgun ... extends up to the Caspian Gates and to the sea, which are in the Hunnish lands. Beyond the gates live the Burgars (Bulgars), who have their language, and are people pagan and barbarian. They have towns. And the Alans - they have five towns." .

The Onoghurs (Oghurs), in the 6th and 7th century sources, were mentioned mostly in connection with the Avar and Göktürk conquest of Western Eurasia. According to the 6th century Menander Protector, the "leader of the Οὐγούρων" had the authority of the Turk Yabgu Khagan in the region of Kuban River to the lower Don. 

In early 7th century Theophylaktos Simokattes recorded that certain Onoghur city Βακάθ was destroyed by an earthquake before his lifetime. The Sogdian name indicates it was situated in the vicinity of Iranian Central Asia. 

Simokattes in the Letter of the Turk Qaγan (Tamgan) to the Emperor Maurikios recorded a complex notice:

"...the Qaghan set off on another undertaking and subjugated all the Ὀγώρ. This people is (one) of the most powerful because of their numbers and their training for war in full battle-gear. They have made their abodes towards the East, whence flows the river Τίλ, which the Turks have the custom of calling the "Black". The oldest chieftains of this people are called Οὐάρ and Χουννί."

According to the Qaghan, part of those Ouar (Uar) and Khounni (Huns) who arrived to Eastern Europe were mistook by the Onoghurs, Barsils, Sabirs and other tribes for the original Avars, and as such the Uar and Huns took advantage of the situation and began call themselves Avars. Simokattes also recounts "when the Ogor, then, were brought completely to heel, the Qaγan gave over the chief of the Κὸλχ (Kolx) to the bite of the sword", shows Oghurs resistance toward Turkic authority. Scholars consider if the Til is Qara Itil (Black Itil) i.e. Volga (Atil/Itil), then the mentioned Ὀγώρ would be the Oghurs, while if it is in Inner Asia, then it could be the Uyghurs.

Old Bulgaria

Kubrat organised the Onogurs under his Empire of Old Great Bulgaria in the Mid 7th century. From the 8th century, the Byzantine sources often mention the Onoghurs in close connection with the Bulgars. Agathon (early 8th century) wrote about the nation of Onoghur Bulgars. Nikephoros I (early 9th century) noted that Kubrat was the lord of the Onoghundurs; his contemporary Theophanes referred to them as Onoghundur–Bulgars. Kubrat successfully revolted against the Avars and founded the Old Great Bulgaria (Magna Bulgaria), also known as Onoghundur–Bulgars state, or Patria Onoguria in the Ravenna Cosmography. Constantine VII (mid-10th century) remarked that the Bulgars formerly called themselves Onogundurs.

This association was previously mirrored in Armenian sources, such as the Ashkharatsuyts, which refers to the Olxontor Błkar, and the 5th century History by Movses Khorenatsi, which includes an additional comment from a 9th-century writer about the colony of the Vłĕndur Bułkar. Marquart and Golden connected these forms with the Iġndr (*Uluġundur) of Ibn al-Kalbi (c. 820), the Vnndur (*Wunundur) of Hudud al-'Alam (982), the Wlndr (*Wulundur) of Al-Masudi (10th century) and Hungarian name for Belgrad Nándorfehérvár, the nndr (*Nandur) of Gardīzī (11th century) and *Wununtur in the letter by the Khazar King Joseph. All the forms show the phonetic changes typical of late Oghuric (prothetic w-; o- > wo-, u-, *wu-).

See also
 Turkic tribal confederations
 Kutrigurs
 Utigurs
 Bulgars

Notes

References

Turkic peoples of Europe
Migration Period
Extinct Turkic peoples